Michael Vey: Hunt for Jade Dragon is the fourth book of the heptalogy series of books Michael Vey, written by Richard Paul Evans. The first book in the series, Michael Vey: The Prisoner of Cell 25, was #1 on the New York Times Best Seller list.

Plot
The Electroclan travel to Timepiece Ranch (a base owned by the Voice). There Michael, Ostin, and Taylor meet their respective parents (with the exception of Taylor's father) along with fellow Glows, Grace and Tanner. The Clan is briefed about their mission to rescue Jade Dragon, a Chinese child prodigy who has figured out how to make more electric children. On the last night before the mission begins Michael has a "prom" with Taylor after he heard her remorse over never being able to go back to regular life. Before he goes the resistance tells Michael that he should recruit Nichelle to combat Hatch's electric children. Michael is at first reluctant to seek Nichelle's help as he cannot trust her, but he ultimately decides to make her an offer.

Michael and the Clan fly back to Pasadena to approach Nichelle. Though at first hesitant, (Michael tempted her with money) Nichelle agrees to help them in order to get her revenge on Hatch for leaving her to die. The Electroclan journey to Taiwan where they are boarded in a hotel until they can rescue Jade. After a brief reconnaissance of the seemingly impenetrable Starxource plant where Jade Dragon is held, they decide to intercept her while the Elgen move onto the research boat, The Volta.

The Electroclan are ordered to stay in their hotel by their handler while Zeus and Tessa are moved to another Starxource plant in order to confuse the Elgen. However, the Clan grows stir-crazy and leave to explore the local market. When they return, both Nichelle and Taylor act strangely. That night, Nichelle goes to see Hatch and seemingly sells out the rest of the Clan.

The Elgen attack and capture the Electroclan at their hotel. It is then revealed that the 'Taylor' who returned with them from the market was actually Tara, Taylor's twin sister who is with Hatch and the rest of the Elgen. Michael then is tortured by an Elgen assassin until someone who appears to be Michael's father stops him. After a brief exchange, Michael's 'father' states the "Elgen are the good guys."

Nichelle visits Michael in his cell, and he quickly attacks her. Nichelle reveals that she knew Tara had switched places with Taylor all along, but didn't say anything because she knew that Hatch would just kill Taylor. Together, Michael and Nichelle free the rest of the Electroclan and escape the compound.

After meeting back up with Zeus and Tessa, the Clan regroups back at a safe house. Ian reveals to Michael that the man he thought was his father was actually Hatch disguised by Tara's new power. The two then tell their handler that Hatch might know where Timepiece Ranch is with information Michael had given him.

The Clan soon successfully rescues Jade Dragon. On their way back to the safe house, Michael and Taylor learn that Jade's parents were killed by the Elgen when she was kidnapped. Realizing that he can't bear the danger of losing those he loves anymore, Michael tells Taylor that he intends to leave when they return home. The Clan is shocked to learn that the Elgen have attacked the Ranch and that there are no reported survivors. Devastated, Michael demands to go to the Ranch despite the danger.

Characters
 Michael Vey: The main protagonist of the series. He is 15 and has Tourette's syndrome. Power: He can produce high voltages of electricity, as well as absorb it. Michael has also gained magnetic abilities and can also create balls of electricity by cupping his hands
 Taylor Ridley: high school cheerleader and girlfriend of Vey. Power: Scramble brain signals, and telepathy through physical contact.
Ostin Liss: Unpopular in school, but Michael's best friend. Power: None, other than his high IQ
 Dr. C. J. Hatch: The main antagonist of the series.  Director of the Elgen Academy. Power: An army of Elgen soldiers, he also commands 5 of the Electric Children.
 Lung Li: They wear all black and are an elite Elgen ninja force.
 Ian: Power: Can see everything within a certain area by electrolocation.
 Jade Dragon: She came up with the algorithm to fix the MEI.
 Abigail: Power: She can stimulate nerve endings which is used to nullify pain.
 McKenna: Power: She can produce immense heat and light.
 Jack: Power: None, except for his strength and fighting skill.
 Zeus: Power: Can project electricity from his body, and outwards like lightning.
 Tessa: Power: Enhance the powers of other electric children.
Tanner: Power: He can tamper with the electrical signals of machinery.
Grace: Power: She can absorb information from electronics.
Tara: Twin of Taylor. Power: She can induce emotions in others such as fear and joy, and create hallucinations.
Quentin: The president of the Elgen Academy. Power: can create an EMP.
Torstyn: The only one that does not have to obey Quentin. Power: He can produce microwaves.
Bryan: Power: Can focus electricity into a laser in order to cut through materials.
Kylee: Power: Magnetic.
Ben: He works for "the Voice". Does not speak English well.
Mrs. Vey: She is at the Ranch and is Michael Vey's mother.
Mr.Vey: He is Michael Vey's father and seems to be under the impression the Elgen are the good guys. However, it is later revealed that the man who believes this is actually Dr. Hatch in disguise.
Mrs. Ridley: She went to the Ranch, and was told she was going on a business trip instead.
Mrs. Liss: Ostin's Mother. She is at the ranch.
Mr. Liss: Ostin's Father. He is at the ranch but the ranch is raided by the Elgen later.
EGG Welch: Hatch's right-hand-man. Commander of Elgen Army. 
Nichelle: Power: Drains electricity of other Glows. Can also make cameras not work. Her weakness is when Michael pulses and overloads Nichelle's drain.

References

Sequel
The sequel of this book, Michael Vey: Storm of Lightning'' was published on September 15, 2015.

External links

 Michael Vey Official Site
 Richard Paul Evans Official Website

2014 American novels
2014 science fiction novels
American science fiction novels
American young adult novels
Hunt for Jade Dragon, Michael Vay
Sequel novels
Superhero novels
Simon & Schuster books